Temple Sholom (formally Temple Sholom of Chicago) is a Reform Jewish congregation located at 3480 N. Lake Shore Drive in Chicago, Illinois. Founded in 1867, it is one of the oldest and largest  synagogues in Chicago with over 1,100 Member Families

Architecture
The current building's design began as a 1921 assignment given to three students at the School of Architecture at the Armour Institute (now the Illinois Institute of Technology) with the assistance of professional architects Charles Hodgson of Chicago and Charles Allerton Coolidge of Boston. The official architects for the Byzantine Revival and Moorish Revival synagogue were Loebl, Schlossman and DeMuth. The western wall of the 1,350 seat sanctuary was mounted on wheels so that it could be moved, opening the room into the adjoining social hall almost doubling the capacity.

In 1972, Israeli artist Nehemia Azaz was commissioned to create a set of five stained glass windows representing selections from Job, Proverbs, Psalms, Ezra and Nehemiah.

Later, in 1996 Leon Golub was given a commission to design a set of stained glass windows for Temple Sholom in Chicago, the four windows depict the life of Joseph. These would be the only stained glass windows Leon Golub ever did. They were fabricated in New York by Victor Rothman and Gene Mallard.

Rabbi Frederick C. Schwartz Library and Mendelson Gallery
The Rabbi Frederick C. Schwartz Library holds 6,000 adult books, 2,000 children's books, 300 videos and 30 journals. The Mendelson Gallery exhibits Jewish art.

Rabbi Shoshanah Conover is the first female senior rabbi in Chicago and only the 8th and first woman Senior Rabbi Temple Sholom has had during its 153-year history! 

Senior Rabbi - Shoshanah Conover  

Associate Rabbi - Scott Gellman  

Assistant Rabbi - Rena Singer
 
Cantor Sheera Ben-David

Past 
Senior Rabbi Edwin C. Goldberg, 2013 - 2019. Before joining Temple Sholom, Rabbi Goldberg served as the Senior Rabbi of Temple Judea in Coral Gables, Florida for seventeen years.

Senior Rabbi Frederick C. Schwartz, 1974 - 1997, having previously served in St. Paul, MN.

Senior Rabbi Aaron Mark Petuchowski, 1997 - 2012, having previously served at Temple Sinai of Roslyn, New York for fourteen years. 

Cantor Aviva Katzman, 1987-2015. Cantor Emerita 2015-current. Cantor Aviva Katzman was the first female member of the Jewish clergy in the city of Chicago.

See also
 History of the Jews in Chicago

References

Synagogues completed in 1928
Moorish Revival synagogues
Byzantine Revival synagogues
Reform synagogues in Illinois
Religious organizations established in 1867
Synagogues in Chicago
1867 establishments in Illinois